Sheikha Helawy (شيخة حليوى)(1968–present) is a Palestinian writer and poet born in Tail al-Arr in the outskirts of Haifa, and moved to Jaffa in 1989. She is known as a prominent writer in the field of Palestinian literature within the Green Line.

Education 
Helawy attended Nazareth Nuns High School in Haifa, and then pursued her bachelor's degree and master's degree in education and Arabic language, and she worked in the field of counselling and educational curricula.

Career 
Helawy published four storytelling collections including a poetry collection:

 The Ladies of the Dark (2015) Ar: سيدات العتمة
 The Window's are Bad Books (2016) Ar: النوافذ كُتب رديئة
 Outside of Classes is Where I Learned to Fly (2016) Ar: خارج الفصول تعلمتُ الطيران
 Order C345 (2018) Ar: الطلبية C345

And regarding Order C345, Helawy received the Forum Award for Arabic Short Stories at its fourth session, valued at $20 thousand.

In addition, her works were translated to various languages including English, German, and Bulgarian, and published in numerous specialised journals.

Furthermore, she participated in several events including the Monte Carlo Doualiya International Poetry Spring Event, where she cast her poem titled Escape.

Reviews   
Helawy's writings were considered to be characterised by self-narrative by the presence of the speaker's conscience, along with topics in relevance to the surroundings, revolving upon emotions and intellectuality, along with being accurate with her descriptions 

Additionally, it was said that Helawy emphasised the importance of educating the reader that a Palestinian has the right to love, hate and imagine. and did not tend to portray the places she describes within her writings a perfect portrayal.

Furthermore, critics described her writing and diction as ones to contain irony, pointing out to one of her short story collections as of containing a "monotonous, pale, and ordinary title", but at the same time the content of the story revolves upon "strong emotions" of joy, dancing, and love.

See also 
Palestinian literature

References 

21st-century Palestinian writers
Palestinian women writers
Living people
Palestinian literature
1968 births